A butterfly knife, also known as a balisong, fan knife or Batangas knife, is a type of folding pocketknife that originated in the Philippines. Its distinct features are two handles counter-rotating around the tang such that, when closed, the blade is concealed within grooves in the handles. A latch sometimes holds the handles together, typically mounted on the one facing the cutting edge (the "bite handle").

The balisong was commonly used by Filipinos, especially those in the Tagalog region, as a self-defense and pocket utility knife. Hollow-grind balisongs were also used as straight razors before conventional razors were available in the Philippines. In the hands of a trained user, the knife blade can be brought to bear quickly using one hand. Manipulations, called "flipping", are performed for art or amusement. Blunt "trainer" versions of these knives are available and can be used to practice tricks without the risk of injury.

The knife is now illegal or restricted in some countries, often under the same laws and for the same reasons that switchblades or concealed weapons are restricted. Within the Philippines, it is no longer as common in urban areas as in the past.

Name
Names for the knives in English include "fan knives" and "butterfly knives" from the motion, and "click clacks" from the sound they make when they are opened and closed.

The name "balisong" is derived from barangay (village) Balisong, part of the municipality of Taal, Batangas province, which along with the neighboring barangay Pandayan, were the original manufacturing centers of the knives in the Philippines. The two barangays were home to a blacksmith industry that also produced other bladed implements such as bolo knives. It is also claimed that the meaning of the term balisong is derived from the Tagalog words baling sungay (literally, "broken/folding horn") as the hilt of the blade were traditionally made from carved carabao and deer horn, as well as bones.

History
The origin of the knives is unclear. Oral histories claim that the knives were first created in the Philippines in 800 AD. However, there is no documentation or archeological evidence to back this. Balisong mass production in the Philippines can only be attested to the early 1900s. Another claim is that balisong were originally an adaptation of a French measuring tool called the pied du roi ("foot of the king"), invented between the 1500s to the late 1700s. However, how it was introduced to the Philippines is unknown. There are theories that it may have been introduced by sailors in the Spanish Empire, which was then allied to France.

Regardless of origin, the modern balisong was perfected in the Philippines, where it became much larger and was predominantly used as a weapon, not just a tool. The quick opening techniques ("flipping") were also developed in the Philippines. In contrast, the French pied du roi was primarily a folding ruler, with the knife only included in some specimens as a novelty. They were cumbersome to open and unlikely to be used for self-defense, especially since they also commonly included a metal tang at a right angle from the end of the handle to aid in measuring. There were also very similar designs to the balisong produced in England in the late 19th century, presumably also derived from the pied du roi. But like the latter they were primarily utilitarian tools.

Construction
There are two main types of balisong construction: "sandwich construction" and "channel construction".

Sandwich constructed balisong knives are assembled in layers that are generally pinned or screwed together. They allow the pivot pins to be adjusted more tightly without binding. When the knife is closed, the blade rests between the layers.

For a channel constructed balisong, the main part of each handle is formed from one piece of material. In this handle, a groove is created (either by folding, milling, or being integrally cast) in which the blade rests when the knife is closed. This style is regarded as being stronger than sandwich construction.

Additionally, the two constructions can be combined to form the "chanwich construction", which involves two halves of a channel handle screwed together. Although rare, this construction generally keeps the best elements of both constructions and discards the worst, as it retains the better handle shape channel construction is known for, while still allowing adjustment of the tightness the handles are held together with to some extent, as well as easier access to the inside of the handle for cleaning. One notable example would be the Tsunami from Squid Industries.

There are also three methods of operation balisongs use: bearings, bushings, or only washers.

Bearing operated balisongs have small ball bearings housed in a circular concavity around the hole in the pivot. These bearings allow the handles of the balisong to rotate.

Bushing operated balisongs have a small metal bushing slightly thicker than the tang in each pivot hole with a usually bronze disc known as a washer on each side. These washers clamp down on the bushing, but not on the tang, when the pivot screw is tightened, allowing the handle to rotate around the tang.

There are also washer-only operated balisongs which are usually much cheaper and lower quality than the other kinds, as they don't need bushings, but the handles will always bind to the tang when the screws are tightened enough and the washers, tang and handles all wear themselves down much faster due to the increased friction.

Some of the blades of traditional butterfly knives in the Philippines were made from steel taken from railroad tracks thus giving them a decent amount of durability and toughness, while others are made from the recycled leaf springs of vehicles.

Most modern balisongs, such as the Benchmade 51, do not use Tang Pins. Instead, they use "Zen Pins", which are two small pins embedded in the top of the handles of the balisong which make contact with the bottom of the blade. A balisong with zen pins negates the problem of having the tang pins fall out (as is typical of some cheaper models).

Parts
 
 Bite handle The handle that closes on the sharp edge of the blade, and will cut the user if they are holding that handle when the knife closes. This handle usually carries the latch.
 Choil The unsharpened portion of the blade just above the kicker, that makes it easier to sharpen the blade.
 Kicker (or Kick) Area on the blade that prevents the sharp edge from touching the inside of the handle and suffering damage. This is sometimes supplanted by an additional tang pin above the pivots.
 Latch The standard locking system, which holds the knife closed. Magnets are occasionally used instead.
 Latch, Batangas A latch that is attached to the bite handle.
 Latch, Manila A latch that is attached to the safe handle.
 Latch, Spring A latch that utilizes a spring to propel the latch open when the handles are squeezed.
 Latch gate  A block inside the channel of the handles stopping the latch from impacting the blade.
 Pivot joint A pin about which the Tang/Blade/Handle assemblies pivot.
 Safe handle The handle (generally the handle without the latch) that closes on the non-sharpened edge of the blade. 
 Swedge Unsharpened spine of the blade. Some balisongs are also sharpened here or on both sides with either a more traditional look or wavy edges similar to a Kris sword.
 Tang The base of the blade where the handles are attached with pivot pins.
 Tang Pin(s) Pin meant to hold the blade away from the handle when closed to prevent dulling; and, in some cases, a second pin to keep the handles from excessively banging together while the butterfly knife is being manipulated.
 Zen Pins Screws mounted inside the handles that collide with the kicker mounted on the tang to prevent the blade from moving around while in the open or closed position.
 Blade The blade is the piece of steel that runs down the center of the knife that is secured by both handles when closed. One edge of the blade is sharp and will cut the user if they are not careful, especially when flipping the knife. The other edge, called the swedge, is blunt and won't cut the user. The swedge commonly impacts the user's hand when flipping.

Legal status

The balisong has been outlawed in several countries, mainly due to its easy utility in crimes and ability to be easily concealed for the same purpose. In some jurisdictions its criminal use is considered a knife crime.
 In Australia, balisongs are generally classified as a prohibited weapon, which requires a special legitimate excuse to possess it. Australian Legal Definition: A flick knife (or other similar device) that has a blade which opens automatically by gravity or centrifugal acceleration or by any pressure applied to a button, spring or device in or attached to the handle of the knife.
 In Belgium, butterfly knives are illegal.
 In Canada, although not specified by name as a prohibited weapon, the balisong knife is often considered by courts to fall under the "gravity knife" or a centrifugal classification and is, therefore, prohibited, unless grandfathered in before prohibition.
 In the Czech Republic, balisongs, switchblades and gravity knives are treated like normal knives.
 In Denmark, butterfly knives are illegal.
 In Finland, balisongs are legal to be purchased, sold and possessed, and are treated just like regular knives and befall under the edged weapons law. Carrying one in public is permitted if the person carrying one can prove it is used as a tool.
 In France, balisongs are legal to own if one is over 18 years of age but are illegal to carry without official authorization.
 In Germany, the balisong was outlawed when the Waffengesetz (weapons law) was tightened in April 2003 in the aftermath of the Erfurt massacre. Thus buying, possessing, lending, using, carrying, crafting, altering and trading it is illegal and is punishable by up to five years imprisonment, confiscation of the knife and a fine of up to €10,000. Using a butterfly knife for crime of any kind – as is any illegal weapon – is punishable by from 1 to 10 years imprisonment.
In Ireland, butterfly knives are illegal offensive weapons.
 In Italy, balisongs are legal to own if not sharpened on both sides, but illegal to carry without justifiable reason.
 In Lithuania, balisongs among other knives are legal to possess and carry as they are not considered weapons. This excludes switchblades.
 In the Netherlands, balisongs are illegal.
 In New Zealand, balisongs are illegal.
 In Norway, balisongs are illegal.
 In the Philippines, it is now generally illegal to carry one without identification or a proper permit in the streets of the capital because of their prevalent use in crime and altercations. One now needs to demonstrate the need in professional livelihood or utilitarian purpose (such as cutting grass, preparing fruit and meat, being a vendor of knives, being martial arts instructors, etc.) to be able to walk around with bladed implements in the urban areas. Another rule of thumb is that the blade of pocket knives must not exceed the length of the palm and must not be openable by one hand in order to be considered as a utility knife as opposed to a weapon (thus, Swiss Army Knives are legal).
 In Poland, balisongs, switchblades and gravity knives are treated like normal knives.
 In Sweden, it's illegal to carry, import or trade a balisong; legal to own and collect.
 In Switzerland, balisongs are illegal to carry, give, lend, buy, or trade.
 In the United Kingdom, the balisong has been legally classified as an offensive weapon since January 1989. Carrying one in public is an offence under the Prevention of Crime Act 1953. Sale, lending, hiring, giving or importing is prohibited by the Criminal Justice Act 1988, as amended by the Offensive Weapons Act 1996. Any imported are liable to be seized and prosecution may follow. An exception is made for knives of this type over 100 years old, which are classed as antiques.
 In some parts of the United States, it is illegal to possess or carry such a knife in public. In certain jurisdictions, balisongs are categorized as a "gravity knife", "switchblade", or "dagger".
If the length of the blade is more than  they are illegal to buy, sell, transfer, or possess in public although it is legal to possess one if kept at home. (Penal Code section 17235 & 21510.)
 In Hawaii, it is illegal to possess, manufacture, sell, transfer, or transport any balisong/Butterfly-type knife.
 In Kansas, there were once legal restrictions on butterfly knives, however, the Kansas Comprehensive Knife Rights Act decriminalized the carrying of all types of bladed weapons.
In Illinois, it is legal to own and carry a butterfly knife. 
Concealed carry of a double-edged knife is prohibited. Automatic (switchblade) and gravity knives are prohibited.
In Indiana it is legal to own and carry a butterfly knife both open or concealed.
 In Kentucky, the balisong is legal for concealed and open carrying anywhere one is not otherwise prohibited from carrying a concealed deadly weapon.  Kentucky's constitution and revised statutes prohibit cities and counties from enacting weapons laws and restrictions.
 In Maine, it is legal to own, sell, and carry.
 In Massachusetts, the balisong is legal for concealed and open carrying so long as it does not "[present] an objective threat of danger to a person of reasonable and average sensibility." Restrictions also apply depending on the area of the person carrying the knife (such as within a public school).
 In Michigan, the balisong is legal because it is classified as a "folding knife".
 In New Jersey the criminal law, NJSA 2C:39-1, suggests balisongs are illegal but the question of legality or illegality is an open question.
 In New Mexico, possession of a butterfly knife is illegal, because the butterfly knife is a "switchblade" within the meaning of the statute making possession of switchblades unlawful.
 In New York, the balisong has been determined not to be a gravity knife, and therefore not prohibited under the Penal Law [see: People v. Zuniga, 303 A.D.2d 773 (2nd Dept. 2003)] However, the law prohibiting gravity knives was found to be unconstitutional and their possession was decriminalized in 2019.
 In North Carolina, citizens are allowed to carry most pocketknives most of the time. Statute S.14-269, which prohibits the concealed carrying of any "bowie knife, dirk, dagger", or "other deadly weapon of like kind" doesn't apply to an "ordinary pocket knife carried in a closed position".
 In North Dakota, it is legal to own a balisong and carry it openly, however they are illegal to carry concealed, as they are considered to be deadly weapons.
 In Ohio, it is legal to own a balisong and carry it openly, and illegal to carry concealed, as it is considered a deadly weapon.
 in Oklahoma, the balisong is legal for open carry but is illegal to carry concealed.
 In Oregon, it is illegal to carry a concealed balisong.
 In Tennessee, there are no restrictions in carrying a balisong and similar knives, whether open or concealed carrying. Restrictions on these instead focuses on intent rather than merely carrying.
 In Texas, switchblades are legal .
 In Utah, Balisongs are legal to own and carry as long as you are not a "Restricted Person" as described in Utah State Code §76-10-503.
 In Virginia, the balisong is legal for concealed, and open, carrying according to state law.
 In Washington, the balisong is classified as a "spring blade knife", and under state law one cannot manufacture, sell, dispose of, or possess such knives.

Balisong trainers feature a special blunt and unsharpened "blade" and are legal in some areas where balisongs are not.

Popular culture
 The 2012 version of Teenage Mutant Ninja Turtles features Xever wielding butterfly knives.
 The Spy class in Valve Software's Team Fortress 2 wields a butterfly knife as his base melee weapon.
 In Aria the Scarlet Ammo, Kinji Touyama wields a red butterfly knife melee weapon.
 In Battle Angel Alita manga, Alita uses a huge balisong as replacement of her Damascus blade.
In Apex Legends, the butterfly knife is Octane’s heirloom weapon.
In Valorant, the butterfly knife can be purchased as a melee skin.
In Counter Strike Global Offensive, the butterfly knife can be purchased as a melee weapon.
In Standoff 2, the butterfly knife can be purchased as a melee weapon.
In Call of Duty Mobile, the butterfly knife can be used as a melee weapon.

See also
 Arnis
 Balisword
 Fighting knife
 Filipino martial arts
 Hackman butterfly knife
 Jacob's ladder (knife)
 Knife fighting
 Pantographic knife
 Pocketknife

References

External links
 

Arnis
Knives
Pocket knives
Filipino melee weapons
Culture of Batangas
Weapons of the Philippine Army